Auguste Walras (1801–1866) was a French school administrator and economist. He was the father of Léon Walras, who was deeply influenced by his father's view on economics. 

Auguste Walras convinced his son to give up his original literary aspirations to pursue economic studies. It was his idea to take rareté (scarcity) and utility as the source of value. He also encouraged him to use mathematical tools, probably under the inspiration of his former classmate Augustin Cournot. 

Auguste Walras found the value of goods by setting their scarcity relative to human wants. His own efforts in working out his theories did not extend beyond a sketch which Leon Walras was to draw upon. Auguste Walras' policy stance on nationalization of land was also adopted by the young Walras.

Major works
De la nature de la richesse et de l'origine de la valeur (On the nature of riches and the origin of value), 1831. 
"Considérations sur la mesure de la valeur et sur la fonction de métaux precieux" (Considerations on the measure of value and the role of precious metals), 1836, Revue mensuelle d'économie politique 
Theorie de la Richesse Sociale (Theory of social wealth), 1849. 
Esquisse d'une Théorie de la Richesse (Sketch of a theory of wealth), 1863

Sources
Walras, Léon (1908) Un initiateur en économie politique, A.A. Walras, 1908, La Revue du mois
Walras, Léon (1965). Correspondence of Léon Walras and related papers. Edited by William Jaffé. Amsterdam: North-Holland.

External links 
 Un père oublié: Antoine-Auguste Walras (compte rendu) on Persée 

1801 births
1866 deaths
French economists